Anaerofilum pentosovorans is a Gram-positive strictly anaerobic, mesophilic and acidogenic bacterium from the genus Anaerofilum which has been isolated from sludge from a bioreactor from Frankfurt in Germany.

References

Clostridiaceae
Bacteria described in 1996